Ross Andrew Whiteley (born 13 September 1988) is an English cricketer  who currently plays for Hampshire.

Biography
Whiteley was born in Sheffield. He played with the Derbyshire Second XI from the 2006 season, in the Second XI Championship and Trophy. In the 2008 season Whiteley made his List A debut in September in a Pro40 game against Glamorgan followed shortly by his First-class debut against Leicestershire in the County Championship. He also played three Pro40 matches in the 2009 season. He is a left-handed batsman.

In the 2012 season Whiteley hit the winning runs that promoted Derbyshire as Division 2 winners into Division 1.

On 25 July 2013, Whiteley signed for the remaining 2013 season and a further 3 years with Worcestershire County Cricket Club. Making his debut on 26 July 2013.

Whiteley's brother Adam, two years his senior, played for Derbyshire's Second XI between 2003 and 2007.

Whiteley then produced a powerful innings in a 2015 t20 blast game versus Yorkshire, his innings of 91* off 36 balls included 11 sixes.

On 13 August 2015 Whiteley signed a new 4-year contract with Worcestershire ensuring his future with them him to the summer of 2019.

On 23 July 2017, Whiteley hit six sixes in the same over during Worcestershire's match against Yorkshire in the 2017 NatWest t20 Blast.

On 15 September 2018, Ross was a part of the Worcestershire Rapids side that made their first appearance at finals day which ended in victory. The Rapids beat Lancashire Lightning in the semi final as well as beating Sussex Sharks by 4 wickets to secure their maiden T20 Blast Trophy.

On 20 September 2021, Whiteley signed for Hampshire on a 3-year white-ball deal, after impressing for the Southern Brave in the ECB's inaugural Hundred tournament.

In April 2022, he was bought by the Southern Brave for the 2022 season of The Hundred.

References

External links

1988 births
English cricketers
Living people
Derbyshire cricketers
NBC Denis Compton Award recipients
People educated at Repton School
Worcestershire cricketers
Sylhet Strikers cricketers
Multan Sultans cricketers
Cricketers from Sheffield
Marylebone Cricket Club cricketers
Southern Brave cricketers
Hampshire cricketers
Brisbane Heat cricketers